Fochabers Lhanbryde is one of the eight wards used to elect members of the Moray Council. It elects three Councillors. As of 2022, it has been represented by Marc Macrae (Conservative), Shona Morrison (SNP) and Ben Williams (Labour).

Councillors

Election results

2022 results
2022 Moray Council election

2017 Election
2017 Moray Council election

2012 Election
2012 Moray Council election

2007 Election
2007 Moray Council election

References

Wards of Moray